Stenorhopalus annulata is a species of beetle in the family Cerambycidae. It was described by Philippi & Philippi in 1864.

References

Beetles described in 1864
Necydalinae